For Muzik is the debut extended play by South Korean girl group 4Minute. It features their debut single "Hot Issue". The title track "Muzik" was used to promote the mini-album, as well as "What a Girl Wants" later that year.

Release 
After the release of their debut single, "Hot Issue", the group started recording their first album, including a remix of "Hot Issue" done by Shinsadong Tiger.  The album was released digitally on August 28, 2009. Both first single were a huge success, with "Hot Issue" charting #20 and Muzik charting #21 in the Melon Chart Yearly 2009 chart, both have estimated digital sales of 3,000,000 - 4,000,000.

Hot Issue was re-released in higher quality on 1thek on January 22, 2019.

Promotion 
The group promoted the album by performing "Hot Issue", "Muzik" and "What a Girl Wants" on various TV shows. These included Mnet's M! Countdown, KBS's Music Bank, MBC's Show! Music Core and SBS's Inkigayo. Promotions lasted from June until the end of December 2009. The album was also promoted in Japan, where a repackaged version of the album was released.

On September 1, 2009, the music video for "Muzik" was released. It with the intro track "For Muzik", followed by a scene showing the group dancing in a room with flashing lights. There are individual inter-scenes of single members wearing latex leggings and dancing to the song.

Controversy 
On August 31, 2009, Korean broadcaster KBS banned the playing of the song "Anjullae" ( "Won't Give You") because of inappropriate lyrics, specifically the following line: "오늘부터 너 한테 나 안줄래 / 이제 다신 내 맘 전부 안줄래 / 이젠 다시 너한테는 안 줄래", which roughly translates to "Starting from today, I won't give myself to you. Now, I will never give you my entire heart. Now, I won't ever give myself to you." In response, Cube Entertainment stated, "The lyrics for "Anjullae" is about the pure feelings of a girl to a guy. We are very disappointed that the lyrics were deemed inappropriate."

Track listing

Release history

References

External links 
 
 
 

Cube Entertainment EPs
2009 EPs
4Minute EPs
Korean-language EPs